Santa Maria di Piazza is a Baroque-style, Roman Catholic church located on Piazza Santa Maria in the town of Serrapetrona, province of Macerata, region of Marche, Italy.

History
A Romanesque-style church at the site was reconstructed in 1775. The brick façade has two story Tuscan pilasters. The interiors have a Neoclassical sobriety. The presbytery has a large canvas depicting the Assumption of the Holy Virgin with Saints, Angels and the Eternal Father, attributed to Angelo Antonio Bittarelli. It also houses paintings by Domenico Luigi Valeri.

References

Baroque architecture in Marche
Neoclassical architecture in le Marche
18th-century Roman Catholic church buildings in Italy
Roman Catholic churches completed in 1775
Serrapetrona
Neoclassical church buildings in Italy